The Deacon Abijah Richardson House is a historic house at 334 Hancock Road in Dublin, New Hampshire. Built in 1818 by the son of an early settler, it is a well-preserved example of an early 19th-century Cape-style farmhouse. It was listed on the National Register of Historic Places in 1983.

Description and history
It is a -story timber-frame structure, with a gabled roof and clapboarded exterior. It has a five-bay facade with a center entry, and a narrow central chimney that is a replacement of an earlier large one. It is oriented with its main facade facing south (perpendicular to the road), with a 19th-century shed extension extending from the northeast corner. Additional outbuildings include a barn and blacksmith's shop.

The house was built in 1818 by Abijah Richardson, Jr., son of one of Dublin's first settlers, whose house stands across the street a short way to the north. The Richardsons have long been a fixture in this part of Dublin. This house was still in the hands of Richardson descendants in the 1980s.

See also
John Richardson Homestead
National Register of Historic Places listings in Cheshire County, New Hampshire

References

Houses on the National Register of Historic Places in New Hampshire
Houses completed in 1818
Houses in Dublin, New Hampshire
National Register of Historic Places in Dublin, New Hampshire